Mahaboudha Temple is a shikhara Newar Buddhist temple in Lalitpur, Nepal.

The temple dates back to 1585 and it was rebuilt after the 1934 Nepal–India earthquake. Mahaboudha's design is loosely based on the Mahabodhi Temple, Bodh Gaya.

References

Further reading
von Schroeder, Ulrich. 2019. Nepalese Stone Sculptures. Volume One: Hindu; Volume Two: Buddhist. (Visual Dharma Publications). . Contains SD card with 15,000 digital photographs of Nepalese sculptures and other subjects as public domain.

Hindu temples in Lalitpur District, Nepal
16th-century establishments in Nepal